The Gillom Trophy or C Spire Gillom Trophy is an award given annually to the best women's college basketball player in the state of Mississippi by the Mississippi Sports Hall of Fame. It is open to players from all four-year colleges in Mississippi.

The trophy is named after former Ole Miss Rebels women's basketball player Peggie Gillom-Granderson.

Winners

Trophies won by school

See also
Howell Trophy - award given annually to the best men's college basketball player in the state of Mississippi by the Mississippi Sports Hall of Fame.
C Spire Ferriss Trophy - award given annually to the best men's college baseball player in the state of Mississippi by the Mississippi Sports Hall of Fame.
Conerly Trophy - an award given annually to the best college football player in the state of Mississippi by the Mississippi Sports Hall of Fame.
Hull Trophy- an award given annually to the best college offensive lineman in Mississippi by the Mississippi Sports Hall of Fame.

References

College basketball trophies and awards in the United States
Basketball in Mississippi
College women's basketball in the United States